How You Like Me Now? is a 2009 song by English rock band The Heavy. 

How You Like Me Now? may also refer to:

How Ya Like Me Now, 1987 album by Kool Moe Dee
"How Ya Like Me Now" (song), title track from above album
"How You Like Me Now", 2011 song by Alexis Jordan from Alexis Jordan
"How U Like Me Now?" 2015 song by Yung Lean and ThaiBoy Digital from the deluxe edition of Warlord

See also
How Do You Like Me Now?!, 1999 album by Toby Keith
"How Do You Like Me Now?!" (song), title track from above album
How You Love Me Now, 2008 song by Hey Monday from Hold On Tight